is a Japanese professional golfer who plays on the PGA Tour. He is the first-ever Japanese professional golfer to win a men's major golf championship  the 2021 Masters Tournament.

As of January 2022, Matsuyama has 17 worldwide wins, eight career top-10 finishes in major championships, and five Presidents Cup appearances. Matsuyama is a two-time winner of tournaments in the World Golf Championships, two-time winner of the Waste Management Phoenix Open, eight-time Japan Golf Tour winner, and two-time winner of the Asian Amateur Championship. His eight wins on the PGA Tour make him the most successful Japanese member of the PGA Tour in history.

He attained his highest rank of second in the Official World Golf Rankings for men in June 2017.

Early life and amateur career
Matsuyama was born on 25 February 1992 in Matsuyama, Ehime, Japan. He was introduced to golf at the age of four, by his father. During eighth grade, he transferred to Meitoku Gijuku Junior & Senior High School in Kochi Prefecture, in search of a better golf environment.

Matsuyama studied at Tohoku Fukushi University in Sendai. He won the 2010 Asian Amateur Championship with a score of 68-69-65-67=269. This gave him the chance to compete as an amateur in the 2011 Masters Tournament, becoming the first Japanese amateur to do so. At the Masters, Matsuyama was the leading amateur and won the Silver Cup, which is presented to the lowest scoring amateur. He was the only amateur to make the cut. A week after his victory, he finished in a tie for third at the Japan Open Golf Championship which is an event on the Japan Golf Tour.

In 2011, Matsuyama won the gold medal at the 2011 World University Games. He also led the Japan team to the gold medal in the team event. In October 2011, he also successfully defended his title at the Asian Amateur Championship. In November, Matsuyama won the Mitsui Sumitomo VISA Taiheiyo Masters on the Japan Golf Tour while still an amateur.

In August 2012, Matsuyama reached number one in the World Amateur Golf Ranking.

Professional career

2013 
Matsuyama turned professional in April 2013 and won his second professional tournament, the 2013 Tsuruya Open on the Japan Golf Tour. Five weeks later, Matsuyama won his third title on the Japan Golf Tour at the Diamond Cup Golf tournament. Following a top 10 finish at the 2013 U.S. Open, Matsuyama entered the top 50 of the Official World Golf Ranking. He won his fourth Japan Golf Tour event in September at the Fujisankei Classic. Matsuyama would win his fifth Japan Golf Tour event in December at the Casio World Open. The win also made Matsuyama the first rookie to lead the Japan Tour's money list.

2014 
For 2014, Matsuyama qualified for the PGA Tour through non-member earnings. In just seven PGA Tour-sanctioned events, Matsuyama had six top-25 finishes, including a T-6 at the 2013 Open Championship.

Matsuyama earned his first PGA Tour win at the 2014 Memorial Tournament, beating Kevin Na in a playoff and moving to a career-high OWGR ranking of 13th. The win was the first for a Japanese player since Ryuji Imada in 2008. In his first full season as a PGA tour member, he finished 28th in the FedEx Cup standings.

Matsuyama would win his sixth Japan Golf Tour event late in the 2014 season. In November, the victory came at the Dunlop Phoenix in a playoff over Hiroshi Iwata.

2015 
Matsuyama finished fifth at the 2015 Masters Tournament, the best major finish of his career to that point. He finished 16th in the FedEx Cup standings. In 8–11 October, he played for the International Team in the 2015 Presidents Cup and went 2–1–1 (win–loss–half).

2016 
On 7 February 2016, Matsuyama won the Waste Management Phoenix Open in a playoff with Rickie Fowler. He secured his victory on the fourth hole. The win moved him to 12th in the Official World Golf Ranking, the highest in his career.

On 16 October 2016, Matsuyama captured the Japan Open by three strokes over Yuta Ikeda and Lee Kyoung-hoon. The win was  Matsuyama's first title at his country's national open and his seventh victory in Japan. The title gives Matsuyama victories in four of the Japan Golf Tour's five ￥200,000,000 events.

On 30 October 2016, Matsuyama followed up his Japan Open triumph by winning the WGC-HSBC Champions, colloquially known as "Asia's Major", in Shanghai. Matsuyama became the first Asian golfer to claim a World Golf Championship since the series was inaugurated in 1999. With the victory, Matsuyama rose to number 6 in the Official World Golf Ranking, his highest position and the second highest ever by a Japanese player after Masashi Ozaki, who achieved a ranking of fifth. He later moved up to fifth in the world after the Farmers Insurance Open. On 13 November 2016, Matsuyama won his second Taiheiyo Masters, following his victory as a 19-year-old amateur in 2011. He romped to a seven-shot win over South Korea's Song Young-han. On 4 December 2016, Matsuyama won the Hero World Challenge in the Bahamas.

2016 Olympics withdrawal
Although he was the highest ranked male Japanese golfer at the time, Matsuyama withdrew from participating in the 2016 Rio Olympic Games out of concern about the 2016 Zika virus epidemic, which caused several of the world's top players to withdraw from the Olympic golf event.

2017
In Matsuyama's return to the Waste Management Phoenix Open, he again entered a playoff on Sunday to defend his title, this time against Webb Simpson. On the fourth playoff hole, Matsuyama made birdie to win the tournament for the second time in as many years. After finishing second in the 2017 U.S. Open at Erin Hills, while the top three players in the world at the time (Dustin Johnson, Rory McIlroy and Jason Day) failed to make the cut, Matsuyama reached 2nd in the Official World Golf Ranking, his highest ever, and the highest ever for a male Japanese golfer.

The 2017 season has been a breakthrough year with Matsuyama winning three Tour titles, including his first World Golf Championship, and three second-place finishes in his first 15 events, as well as winning $5,945,990, putting him second on the money list behind Dustin Johnson, before the month of July. He then won the WGC-Bridgestone Invitational in August, shooting a course record-tying 61 in the final round to win by five strokes.

At the 2017 PGA Championship, Matsuyama had opening rounds of 70–64 to share the 36-hold lead, with Kevin Kisner at Quail Hollow.

2019
In December 2019, Matsuyama played on the International team at the 2019 Presidents Cup at Royal Melbourne Golf Club in Australia. The U.S. team won, 16–14. Matsuyama went 2–1–1 and halved his Sunday singles match against Tony Finau.

2021
On 11 April 2021, Matsuyama won the Masters Tournament, becoming both the first Japanese player and the first Asian-born player to win the tournament. He finished with an overall score of 278 (−10), one shot ahead of runner-up Will Zalatoris. At the conclusion of the tournament, Matsuyama's caddie, Shota Hayafuji, bowed to the 18th fairway of the Augusta course as a gesture of Japanese respect.

In August, Matsuyama finished in a tie for 3rd place at the Olympic Games. He lost in a 7-man playoff for the bronze medal. The following week Matsuyama was tied for the lead after 72 holes at the WGC-FedEx St. Jude Invitational. He was beaten in the playoff when Abraham Ancer birdied the second extra hole.

In October 2021, Matsuyama won the Zozo Championship at Narashino Country Club. The Zozo Championship is the only PGA Tour event held in Japan. Matsuyama won by five strokes over Cameron Tringale and Brendan Steele.

2022
On 16 January 2022, Matsuyama won the Sony Open in Hawaii; having made up a five-shot deficit on the back nine to get into a playoff with Russell Henley, he made an eagle on the first extra hole to claim the victory. It was his eighth win on the PGA Tour, tying K. J. Choi for most tour victories by an Asian-born player.

On 2 June 2022, at the Memorial Tournament at Muirfield Village Golf Club in Dublin, Ohio, Matsuyama was disqualified midway through his first round due to having a white paint-like substance on the face of his 3-wood. The substance was said to have been applied by his equipment technician to help with alignment.

Matsuyama qualified for the International team at the 2022 Presidents Cup; he won one, tied one and lost three of the five matches he played.

Personal life 
Matsuyama's wife is Mei (married in January 2017) and his daughter is Kanna (born in July 2017).

Amateur wins
2010 Asia-Pacific Amateur Championship
2011 Japan Collegiate Championship, World University Games, Asia-Pacific Amateur Championship
2012 Japan Collegiate Championship

Professional wins (17)

PGA Tour wins (8)

1Co-sanctioned by the Japan Golf Tour, but unofficial money event.

PGA Tour playoff record (4–1)

Japan Golf Tour wins (8)

*Note: The 2013 Mitsui Sumitomo Visa Taiheiyo Masters was shortened to 54 holes due to weather.
 The Japan Open Golf Championship is also a Japan major championship.

Japan Golf Tour playoff record (2–0)

Other wins (1)

Major championships

Wins (1)

Results timeline
Results not in chronological order in 2020.

LA = Low amateur
CUT = missed the half-way cut
"T" indicates a tie for a place
NT = No tournament due to COVID-19 pandemic

Summary

 Most consecutive cuts made – 10 (2020 PGA – 2022 Open Championship, current)
Longest streak of top-10s – 2 (2013 U.S. Open – 2013 Open Championship)

Results in The Players Championship

CUT = missed the halfway cut
"T" indicates a tie for a place
C = Cancelled after the first round due to the COVID-19 pandemic

World Golf Championships

Wins (2)

Results timeline
Results not in chronological order before 2015.
 
1Cancelled due to COVID-19 pandemic

WD = Withdrew
QF, R16, R32, R64 = Round in which player lost in match play
NT = no tournament
"T" = tied

PGA Tour career summary

* As of the 2022 season

Team appearances
Amateur
Eisenhower Trophy (representing Japan): 2008, 2012
World University Games (representing Japan): 2011 (winners)
Bonallack Trophy (representing Asia/Pacific): 2012

Professional
Presidents Cup (representing the International team): 2013, 2015, 2017, 2019, 2022
World Cup (representing Japan): 2016

References

External links

Japanese male golfers
Japan Golf Tour golfers
PGA Tour golfers
Winners of men's major golf championships
Olympic golfers of Japan
Golfers at the 2020 Summer Olympics
Golfers at the 2010 Asian Games
Asian Games competitors for Japan
Universiade medalists in golf
Universiade gold medalists for Japan
Medalists at the 2011 Summer Universiade
Sportspeople from Ehime Prefecture
Sportspeople from Sendai
1992 births
Living people